Glisoxepide (INN) is an orally available anti-diabetic drug from the group of sulfonylureas. It belongs to second-generation sulfonylureas.

References

Potassium channel blockers
Azepanes
Carboxamides
Isoxazoles
Benzenesulfonylureas